Like It Is: Yes at the Mesa Arts Center is a live album and video from the English progressive rock band Yes, released on CD and DVD, LP, and Blu-ray on 3 July 2015 in Europe and on 10 July 2015 in North America on Frontiers Records. It is a partial recording of the band's concert on 12 August 2014 at the Mesa Arts Center in Mesa, Arizona as a part of their 2014–15 Heaven & Earth Tour.

This was the final live recording to feature bassist (and last original member) Chris Squire, who died shortly before its release.

Background 
Like It Is: Yes at the Mesa Arts Center is a sequel to Like It Is: Yes at the Bristol Hippodrome, which featured the albums Going for the One and The Yes Album performed in their entirety, in track order. Likewise, Yes at the Mesa Arts Center features complete performances of the albums Close to the Edge and Fragile. Two songs "Believe Again" and "The Game" from the band's most recent studio album Heaven & Earth were performed, along with an encore of "I've Seen All Good People" and "Owner of a Lonely Heart," but have been excluded so that the complete Like It Is set contains just the two albums.

It is of note that the Close to the Edge album was usually played in reverse order during the tour, but for this release it was changed to the original order.

Track listing

Personnel
Yes
Jon Davison – lead vocals, acoustic guitar, percussion, keyboard
Steve Howe – electric and acoustic guitars, steel guitars, backing vocals
Chris Squire – bass guitar, backing vocals, harmonica on "And You and I"
Geoff Downes – keyboards
Alan White – drums

Production
Billy Sherwood - Mixing Engineer
Maor Appelbaum - Mastering Engineer

Chart performance

References

External links
 

2015 live albums
Albums with cover art by Roger Dean (artist)
Frontiers Records albums
Yes (band) live albums
Yes (band) video albums